Karen Barber (born 21 June 1961 in Manchester) is a British ice dancer. She is the 1983 European bronze medalist and competed at two Olympics with partner Nicky Slater.

Skating career
Barber won the silver medal at the 1977 World Junior Championships with partner Kim Spreyer. When that partnership ended, she teamed up with Nicky Slater. They won the bronze medal at the 1983 European Championships. They represented Great Britain at the 1980 Winter Olympics, placing 12th, and at the 1984 Winter Olympics, where they placed 6th.

Following her retirement from competitive skating, Barber worked as a coach and skated professionally.

Media work
From 2006 Barber served as a judge on Dancing On Ice, until 2011 where she was moved into the role of head coach where remained for the 2011 and 2012 series(it was in her 1st year as coach that she got into a big fight with her former co judge Jason Gardiner)  before she returned to the judging panel in 2013 where she remained until the end of series 9 in 2014. Barber did not return to the programme in 2018 but did return for series 11 as head coach in 2019.

Personal life
Barber has two daughters, Laura and Emma, with her former husband, Stephen Pickavance.

She has been in a relationship with Christopher Dean since 2011.

Competitive highlights
(with Slater)

(with Spreyer)

References

External links
 
 
 Biogs.com profile

1961 births
Living people
Sportspeople from Manchester
English female ice dancers
Figure skaters at the 1984 Winter Olympics
Figure skaters at the 1980 Winter Olympics
Olympic figure skaters of Great Britain
Dancing on Ice
European Figure Skating Championships medalists
World Junior Figure Skating Championships medalists
British figure skating coaches
Female sports coaches